Jim Pla (born 6 October 1992 in Béziers) is a French racing driver. He is the younger brother of Olivier Pla

Career

Formula Renault Campus France
Pla began his formula racing career in the 2007 Formula Renault Campus France season. He finished sixth overall in the championship, with one win and 70.5 points.

Formula BMW
The following season, Pla competed in the Formula BMW Europe for DAMS. He finished seventeenth in standings, taking five points-scoring positions in sixteen races. For 2009, Pla remained in the series, staying with DAMS. He finished fifth behind Danish driver Michael Christensen in the championship with four wins in row at Valencia Street Circuit, and Circuit de Spa-Francorchamps.

Formula Three

2010 saw Pla move to the Formula 3 Euro Series, competing for multiple champions ART Grand Prix, joining Valtteri Bottas and Alexander Sims at the team. He finished 10th in the championship with one win and four points finishes out of 18 races. For 2011, Pla was set to switch to the Signature Team.

GP3 Series
Pla made his debut in GP3 Series at Istanbul Park round replacing his fellow Formula Renault Campus rival Jean-Éric Vergne.

Racing record

Career summary

Complete Formula 3 Euro Series results
(key)

Personal life
He is no relation to fellow French driver Olivier Pla. Pla list his hobbies as skiing, cinema, quad biking and soccer, while his favourite circuit is Circuit de Spa-Francorchamps, where he won twice during the 2009 Formula BMW Europe season.

References

External links
Official website
Pla career statistics at Driver Database
 

1992 births
Living people
Sportspeople from Béziers
French racing drivers
Formula BMW Europe drivers
Formula BMW Pacific drivers
Formula 3 Euro Series drivers
French GP3 Series drivers
ART Grand Prix drivers
Blancpain Endurance Series drivers
FIA Motorsport Games drivers
International GT Open drivers
DAMS drivers
Tech 1 Racing drivers
EuroInternational drivers
British Formula Three Championship drivers
Formule Campus Renault Elf drivers
La Filière drivers
GT4 European Series drivers
Porsche Carrera Cup Germany drivers